Seven vessels of the British Royal Navy have borne the name HMS Amphion, after the Greek hero Amphion.

 , launched in 1780, was a 32-gun fifth-rate.
 , launched in 1798, was a 32-gun fifth-rate.
 , launched in 1846, was a wooden-hulled screw frigate.
 , launched in 1883, was a  protected cruiser.
 , launched in 1911, was an  scout cruiser, she was sunk on the 6 August 1914 becoming the first Royal Navy ship to be sunk in World War I.
 HMS Amphion, launched in 1934, was a  light cruiser transferred to the Royal Australian Navy and renamed .
 , launched in 1944, was the name ship of her class of submarines.

References

Royal Navy ship names